Park Chul (born August 20, 1973) is a South Korean professional football manager and former football player who currently is the manager of Chinese club Zibo Cuju.

Club career 
He joined LG Cheetahs in 1994.

International career 
He participated in FIFA U-20 World Cup in 1991 and 1993.

Managerial career 
In February 2021, Park was appointed as new manager of China League One side Zibo Cuju.

References

External links
 

1973 births
Living people
Association football defenders
South Korean footballers
South Korea international footballers
FC Seoul players
Gimcheon Sangmu FC players
Jeju United FC players
Daejeon Hana Citizen FC players
K League 1 players
Association football midfielders